Pedro Nel Gómez Agudelo  (4 July 1899 — 6 June 1984) was a Colombian engineer, painter, and sculptor, best known for his work as a muralist, and for starting, along with Santiago Martinez Delgado, the Colombian Muralist Movement, inspired by the Mexican movement that drew on nationalistic, social, and political messages as subjects.

One of Colombia's most prolific and prominent artists of his time, Gómez created 2,200 square meters of fresco murals in public buildings.

Personal life
Pedro Nel was born on 4 July 1899 in Anorí, Antioquia, to Jesús Gómez González and María Luisa Agudelo Garcés. He attended the Academia de Bellas Artes de Medellín, where he completed his secondary studies in 1917. He then attended College of Mines of Medellín where he graduated in Civil Engineering in 1922. In 1923 he decided to move to Bogotá, where aside from working as an engineer and professor, he studied perspective and artistic anatomy with Francisco Antonio Cano. In 1925 he traveled to Europe and settled in Florence, Italy, where he attended the Accademia di Belle Arti di Firenze. While in Italy he met his future wife, and mother of his eight children, the Florentine, Giuliana Scalaberni. In 1930 he returned to Colombia, and became Director and professor of the Academia de Bellas Artes de Medellín.

Legacy 
As a teacher Nel Gómez has an impact in inspiring a future generation of nationalist artists including Carlos Correa and Débora Arango.

In 2019 the National Museum of Columbia held a retrospective of his work, entitled Pedro Nel Gómez: Relatos de una Nación (Testament of a Nation).

References

Further reading

External links

 Pedro Nel Gómez: Relatos de una Nación at Colombian National Museum

1899 births
1984 deaths
People from Antioquia Department
Muralists
National University of Colombia alumni
Colombian civil engineers
20th-century Colombian painters
20th-century Colombian male artists
Colombian male painters